The Anglo-Afghan Treaty of 1919, also known as the Treaty of Rawalpindi, was a treaty which brought the Third Anglo-Afghan War to an end. It was signed on 8 August 1919 in Rawalpindi by the United Kingdom and the Emirate of Afghanistan. Britain recognised Afghanistan's independence (as per Article 5 of the treaty), agreed that British India would not extend past the Khyber Pass and stopped British subsidies to Afghanistan. Afghanistan also accepted all previously agreed border arrangements with British India as per Article 5 of the Anglo-Afghan treaty of 1919.  Thus, Afghanistan as an independent country agreed to recognise the Durand Line as international border between the two countries.

See also
 First Anglo-Afghan War

Notes

References

Further reading
 
 Fremont-Barnes,  Gregory. The Anglo-Afghan Wars 1839–1919 (2014)
 Tripodi, Christian. "Grand Strategy and the Graveyard of Assumptions: Britain and Afghanistan, 1839–1919." Journal of Strategic Studies 33.5 (2010): 701–725. online

External links
 Treaty Between the British and Afghan Governments. Signed at Kabul, 22 November 1921.
 Original manuscript on official uk govt website

Treaties of the Emirate of Afghanistan
Treaties of the United Kingdom (1801–1922)
Third Anglo-Afghan War
1919 in Afghanistan
1919 in the United Kingdom
1910s in British India
Treaties concluded in 1919
August 1919 events
Durand Line
History of Pakistan
Modern history of Afghanistan
Rawalpindi District
Treaty
Bilateral treaties of the United Kingdom